Turtles Forever is a 2009 American animated superhero television film directed by Roy Burdine and Lloyd Goldfine. A crossover film featuring two different incarnations of the Teenage Mutant Ninja Turtles fighting together, it was produced in celebration of the 25th anniversary of the characters and serves as the series finale to the 2003 series. The film aired on The CW4Kids on November 21, 2009.

Plot 

The Ninja Turtles and their master Splinter are startled to watch a video broadcast of the Turtles fighting the Purple Dragons on TV. The Turtles break into the Purple Dragons' HQ and discover that their "imposters" are actually alternate versions of themselves. They escape together, but the 2003 Turtles find the 1987 team too difficult to control, until they summon Splinter, in whose presence the 1987-Turtles explain that they landed here after fighting their Shredder and Krang over mutagen in the Technodrome. During the battle, the dimensional teleporter malfunctioned, sending them all to the 2003 dimension. Checking recent tremor reports, the Turtles find the Technodrome, only to have to battle an army of Foot-Bots led by Bebop and Rocksteady.

When the 1987-Shredder sees the two Turtle teams, he theorizes that another Shredder might exist in this dimension. After escaping the Turtles, Shredder and Krang locate Ch'rell, the Utrom Shredder, on an icy asteroid where he is banished. After Ch'rell is thawed out, they find him too insane for an alliance and try to vivisect him. However, his adopted daughter Karai, who had been monitoring his exile, breaks into the Technodrome and frees him, declaring the weapon's technology property of the Foot Clan.

While tracking the Technodrome, the Turtles and Splinter are attacked by Hun and the Purple Dragons, who want their mutagen. In the course of the fight, Hun accidentally becomes exposed to it and turns into a mutant turtle. He wanders until coming upon the Technodrome, now under the control of The Utrom Shredder, who takes Hun back into his service.

Ch'rell and Karai begin remaking the Technodrome and creating their army. Using the trans-dimensional portal, Utrom Shredder learns there are many parallel universes filled with Ninja Turtles. Hun, Bebop and Rocksteady are dispatched alongside an army of Utrom Foot-Bots to capture the Turtles, breaking into their lair and it begins crumbling, forcing the Turtles to use their own dimensional portal projector to escape into the 1987 universe while Splinter is captured by Hun. While the turtles are preparing for their fight, they realize that Shredder has started attacking the 2003 universe with the upgraded Technodrome. Casey Jones and April O'Neil try to hold the enemy off, before the Turtle teams arrive. After entering the Technodrome to find Splinter, they are Captured by Utrom Shredder, who announces his plans of wiping out every version of the Ninja Turtles across the multiverse by destroying them in their source dimension, the "Turtle Prime". By scanning the eight turtles DNA, he finds the dimension, but the turtles themselves are saved by Karai who has started to question her father's goals. The turtles are joined by April and Casey and explain the situation to them, they later realize that Shredder has started his plans and their dimension is being erased. They grab some equipment from the Dragon's HQ and after a brief fight with them and Hun which results in their erasure, they escape.

Despite April and Casey being erased as well, the Turtles arrive to the Turtles Prime and quickly encounter their prime counterparts. After some explanation, the twelve Turtles team up together and are joined by Splinter, Karai, '87 Shredder and Krang against the Utrom Shredder. During the scuffle, Ch'rell's exo-suit grows giant but proved to be vulnerable to Technodrome's laser beam. Everyone tries knocking him into the beam before Rocksteady accidentally deactivates it, Utrom Shredder seizes the Prime Turtles and proceeds to destroy them and the entire multiverse, despite knowing he will be destroyed as well, but the 1987 turtles break his balance and save the Prime Turtles and Bebop unknowingly reactivates Technodrome's laser beam which vaporizes Ch'rell in the process.

With their foe defeated and their worlds restored, the two turtle teams along with their allies return to their respective worlds while the Prime Turtles decide to go get some pizza. As somewhere else, in the real world, Peter Laird and Kevin Eastman put the finishing touches on the first issue of Eastman and Laird's Teenage Mutant Ninja Turtles, and go out themselves to get pizza.

Voice cast 
 Michael Sinterniklaas as Leonardo: the leader of the 2003 Turtles.
 Sam Riegel as Donatello: the 2003 Turtles' genius engineer who is identified as the member who holds the team together.
 Greg Abbey as Raphael: 2003 Leo's second-in-command who is stubborn but caring. 
 Wayne Grayson as Michelangelo: the 2003 Turtles' youngest member and a source of comic relief.
 Darren Dunstan as Splinter: the 2003 Turtles' sensei and adopted father.
 Dan Green as 1987 Leonardo: an alternate version of Leo from the 1987 cartoon universe.
 Tony Salerno as 1987 Donatello: an alternate version of Donnie from the 1987 cartoon universe.
 Sebastian Arcelus as 1987 Raphael: an alternate version of Raph from the 1987 cartoon universe.
 Johnny Castro as 1987 Michelangelo: an alternate version of Mikey from the 1987 cartoon universe.
 Castro also voices Rocksteady, a mutant rhinoceros employed as a minion for 1987 Shredder.
 Scottie Ray as Ch'rell/the Utrom Shredder: the leader of the 2003 Foot Clan.
 Karen Neill as Karai: Utrom Shredder's adoptive daughter and the 2003 Foot Clan's second-in-command.
 Greg Carey as Hun: a former ally of the Utrom Shredder and leader of the Purple Dragons, who gets transformed into a ferocious mutant turtle before rejoining the 2003 Foot Clan.
 Veronica Taylor as April O'Neil: an ally of the 2003 Turtles and Casey's wife.
 Marc Thompson as Casey Jones: a vigilante ally of the 2003 Turtles and 2003 April's husband.
 Load Williams as Oroku Saki/1987 Shredder: an alternate version of Shredder from the 1987 cartoon universe.
 Bradford Cameron as Krang: an alien ally of 1987 Shredder from Dimension X
 Cameron also voices 1984 Michelangelo, an alternate version of Mikey from the 1984 Mirage comics universe; and Bebop, a mutant warthog employed as a minion for 1987 Shredder and Rocksteady's partner.

Additionally, Jason Griffith voices 1984 Leonardo, an alternate version of Leo from the 1984 Mirage comics universe; Clay Adams voices 1984 Donatello, an alternate version of Donnie from the 1984 Mirage comics universe; Sean Schemmel voices 1984 Raphael, an alternate version of Raph from the 1984 Mirage comics universe; David Wills voices both 1987 Splinter, an alternate version of Splinter from the 1987 cartoon universe, and 1984 Shredder, an alternate version of Shredder from the 1984 Mirage comics universe; Rebecca Soler voices 1987 April, an alternate version of April from the 1987 cartoon universe; and Peter Laird and Kevin Eastman make voiceover cameos as themselves.

Production 
None of the original voice cast from the 1987 cartoon series reprised their roles nor was the original music from the show used in this special. In the actors' case, the original voice cast are members of SAG-AFTRA, with which 4Kids did not have a contract. For the score, most of the music from the 1987 series is owned by Lionsgate and would require a license fee to be used in the show. For a cost-effective solution, the special used many of the productions' frequent talents and used their in-score team to make a soundtrack reminiscent of the original series.

An edited version of the movie was released on July 11, 2009, worldwide on TV. The film was then released on July 29 in New Zealand, Australia, and Canada. In other countries, the film aired on The CW as part of their Saturday morning The CW4Kids lineup on November 21, as part of a 25th anniversary celebration which featured a top-10 episode countdown preceding the film's television premiere. In the United States, an uncut version aired from October 31 to November 14 in a form where three weekly 26 minute episodes were shown in a half-hour slot per week.

The uncut version of the film later appeared on the CW4Kids's website on November 16, 2009, which includes 8 minutes of footage cut from the original version that aired on TV. The edited version was released on non-anamorphic widescreen DVD on November 21 from Nickelodeon/Paramount Home Entertainment. The uncut anamorphic widescreen version was later released in 2011 on DVD in the PAL DVD regions (2 and 4). There are currently no plans for an American release of the uncut anamorphic version on home video.

Release

Edited scenes
The edited version of the movie (which was used for some TV airings and the Region 1 DVD release) removed several additional scenes which remain intact in the "uncut" version of the movie. Some of those key scenes include:
 1987 and 2003 Donatello work together to locate the Technodrome using underground sonar while riding in their van, which they eventually locate.
 2003 Shredder demands to see the transdimensional portal device during his initial tour of the Technodrome.
 Karai reveals that she located the Technodrome because her monitoring system for 2003 Shredder had alerted her that he had been transported from his previous location to the Technodrome. She then claims the Technodrome in the name of the 2003 Foot Clan.
 1987 Krang and Shredder commiserate about 2003 Shredder ruining their expensive computer equipment in the Technodrome during its renovations.
 As part of the renovations to the Technodrome, 2003 Shredder programmed the computer to now utilize all of his extraneous superlatives when it addresses him. He also states that he is intrigued by the implications of the trans-dimensional portal.
 2003 Raphael calls the 1987 Turtles "clowns", which causes an argument that gets immediately interrupted by Splinter. Splinter then orders them to stop bickering, reminding them that they should be working together, which causes 2003 Raphael to apologize for the insult.
 2003 Casey and April have an extended fight sequence with some enemies who are attacking them.
 The 1987 and 2003 Turtles argue about whose Shredder is worse, calling 2003 Shredder "psycho-evil" and 1987 Shredder "decaf".
 2003 Leonardo gives a more complete explanation regarding the 2003 Shredder's plan when they initially meet up with the Prime Turtles.
 1987 Shredder yells at Rocksteady and Bebop before the Turtles' assault on the Technodrome in Turtle Prime starts.
 Karai warns 2003 Shredder that he is making a grave mistake as he attempts to destroy the Mirage Turtles, pointing out he will destroy himself and her in the process, which causes him to stop briefly before resuming his attempt to eliminate them, no longer caring about his or anyone else's fate.

Reception

Critical response
Turtles Forever received mixed reviews from fans and critics. Alan Ng of Film Threat gave the film 5/10, calling the film "incredibly dated" and the lack of connection felt towards the different sets of Turtles, with "the 1987 crew [...] a little more mature than their 2003 counterparts". The review from DVD Talk called Turtles Forever a "mostly forgettable endeavour" and said that the "cheap shots [against the 1987 Turtles] are pathetic and get old immediately".

References

External links 

  from Mirage Studios
 4Kids TV TMNT site
 
 Turtles Forever review
 Turtles Forever Poster making of

2009 television films
Animated films about turtles
2000s American animated films
2000s animated superhero films
2009 science fiction films
2009 animated films
American television films
American children's animated science fantasy films
American children's animated superhero films
American animated television films
American television series finales
Animated superhero crossover films
Films set in New York City
Animated Teenage Mutant Ninja Turtles films
Forever
Forever
Films about parallel universes
American science fiction television films
2009 martial arts films
2000s English-language films
Animated films about brothers
Ninja films